Jagada Nand Singh (born 15 July 1945) is an Indian politician. He is son of Lt. Ramruchi Singh and has done LLB from  Harish Chander College in  Varanasi in the year 1973. He was a member of the Indian Parliament and represented Buxar (Lok Sabha constituency) in the 15th Lok Sabha from RJD. He was also a 4 term MLA of RJD from Ramgarh Constituency before he became an MP from Buxar of RJD. He is State President of Rashtriya Janata Dal of Bihar.

Background
Singh hails from a Rajput family.

Political career
Singh has been associated with Lalu Prasad Yadav, since the foundation of Rashtriya Janata Dal. He is a socialist class of politician and has been a founder member of RJD, the Bihar based political party. Singh had remained minister in all of the Lalu Prasad's cabinets and had defeated Lal Muni Chaubey of Bharatiya Janata Party successfully from the Buxar constituency in 2009. However, in 2014 and 2019 Singh was defeated from the same constituency by the Bharatiya Janata Party candidates. Described as a loyal member of RJD and a close companion of Lalu Prasad like another leader Raghuvansh Prasad Singh, he was among those who supported candidacy of Rabri Devi for the post of Chief Minister, following the arrest of Lalu Prasad in connection with the Fodder Scam. Singh had even campaigned against his own son Sudhakar in 2010, ensuring his defeat against the Rashtriya Janata Dal candidate. In November 2019, taking everyone by surprise, RJD appointed Singh as its Bihar state president.

References

1945 births
Living people
India MPs 2009–2014
Lok Sabha members from Bihar
Candidates in the 2014 Indian general election
Members of the Bihar Legislative Assembly
Candidates in the 2019 Indian general election
Rashtriya Janata Dal politicians